Stenomordella macrocephala is a species of beetle in the genus Stenomordella of the family Mordellidae. It was described in 1965.

References

Mordellidae
Beetles described in 1965